This is a list of mayors of the Metropolitan Borough of Finsbury. The borough was a Metropolitan borough within the County of London from 1900 to 1965, covering the wards of Clerkenwell and Bunhill, when it was amalgamated with the Metropolitan Borough of Islington to form the London Borough of Islington.

Mayors
1900–1901 Enos Howes
1901–1902 Enos Howes (second term)
1902–1903 James Gibson
1903–1904 Middleton Chapman – died 1922
1904–1905 William Howes
1905–1906 William Reason
1906–1907 Rev. George Henry Perry
1907–1908 Rev. George Henry Perry (second term)
1908–1909 Dr. William Alfred Dingle
1909–1910 Arthur Millward
1910–1911 Edward Henry Tripp
1911–1912 Lieutenant-Colonel Henry Baldwin Barton
1912–1913 Lieutenant-Colonel Henry Baldwin Barton (second term)
1913–1914 William Richard Corke
1914–1915 William Richard Corke (second term)
1915–1916 Lieutenant-Colonel Henry Baldwin Barton (third term)
1916–1917 Lieutenant-Colonel Henry Baldwin Barton (fourth term)
1917–1918 Lieutenant-Colonel Henry Baldwin Barton (fifth term)
1918–1919 Lieutenant-Colonel Henry Baldwin Barton (sixth term)
1919–1920 Lieutenant-Colonel Henry Baldwin Barton (seventh term)
1920–1921 Lieutenant-Colonel Henry Baldwin Barton: knighted 1921 (eighth term)
1921–1922 Charles James Sabourin
1922–1923 William Richard Corke (third term)
1923–1924 Otho William Nicholson
1924–1925 John Thomas Wallis
1925–1926 John Thomas Wallis (second term)
1926–1927 Stephen Geoffrey Nunn
1927–1928 Charles James Sabourin (second term)
1928–1929 Charles James Sabourin (third term)
1929–1930 William Harry Martin
1930–1931 Charles Robert Simpson
1931–1932 Stephen Geoffrey Nunn (second term)
1932–1933 Henry Kennett
1933–1934 George Tripp
1934–1935 Charles Henry Simmons
1935–1936 Charles Henry Simmons (second term)
1936–1937 Mrs. Eva Martin
1937–1938 Charles Alfred Allen
1938–1939 Chuni Lal Katial
1939–1940 William Lewis Prowse
1940–1941 Henry James Dainty
1941–1942 William Francis Drake
1942–1943 Joseph Alfred Gannon
1943–1944 Ald. Harold Riley
1944–1945 Frederick John Barrett
1945–1946 Mrs. Eleanor Allen
1946–1947 Mrs. Rosa Curtis
1947–1949 W. Barrie JP
1949–1950 George Alfred Curtis
1950–1951 Charles Hector McDonald
1951–1952 Philip Bendel
1952–1953 Ald. Ernest Frederick Johnson
1953–1954 Christie Payne
1954–1955 Leslie James Harley
1955–1956 Christie Payne
1956–1957 Michael Cliffe
1957–1958 Michael Cliffe
1958–1959 Albert Smith
1959–1960 Joseph Trotter
1960–1961 Mrs. Catherine Griffiths
1961–1962 William Charles Comley
1962–1963 Charles Slater
1963–1964 Arthur Goldshaw
1964–1965 Samuel William Withey

References

Lists of mayors of London boroughs